Joseph Léonce Vincent Brassard (10 December 1919 – 7 April 1974) was a Canadian politician, manufacturer and meat packer. He was born in Chicoutimi, Quebec, Canada. He was elected to the House of Commons of Canada in 1958 as a Member of the Progressive Conservative Party to represent the riding of Chicoutimi. He was defeated in the elections of 1962 and 1965. He married Judith Voyer (died 1998) and had 10 children. Brassard died in Chicoutimi in 1974.

References

External links

1919 births
1974 deaths
Members of the House of Commons of Canada from Quebec
Politicians from Saguenay, Quebec
Progressive Conservative Party of Canada MPs